Manifesto: Day 1 is the third extended play (EP) by South Korean boy band Enhypen. It was released on July 4, 2022, through Belift Lab. The album consists of six tracks, including the lead single "Future Perfect (Pass the Mic)".

Background and release
On June 14, Belift Lab announced that Enhypen would be releasing their third extended play (EP), Manifesto: Day 1 on July 4, with a trailer titled "Walk the Line" released the same day.

Commercial performance
With 1.24 million copies sold in the first week of release, Manifesto: Day 1 became Enhypen's second million-selling album and made them the fastest K-pop group to earn two albums in the million-seller category. In the United States, Manifesto: Day 1 reached number one on the Billboard Top Album Sales chart.

Track listing

Accolades

Charts

Weekly charts

Monthly charts

Year-end charts

Certifications and sales

Release history

References

2022 EPs
Enhypen EPs
Genie Music EPs
Korean-language EPs
Hybe Corporation EPs